Penicillidae is a family of bivalves belonging to the order Anomalodesmata.

Genera:
 Brechites Guettard, 1770
 Foegia Gray, 1842
 Humphreyia Gray, 1858
 Kendrickian B.Morton, 2004
 Nipponoclava B.J.Smith, 1976
 Verpa Röding, 1798

References

Anomalodesmata
Bivalve families